Vilvestre is a village and municipality in the province of Salamanca,  western Spain, part of the autonomous community of Castile-Leon. It is located 96 kilometres from the provincial capital city of Salamanca and has a population of 468 people.

Geography
The municipality covers an area of 47 km². It lies 592 metres above sea level and the postal code is 37258.

Climate
Situated on the Río Duero, the climate is typical of the Mediterranean with orange and olive groves.

References

Municipalities in the Province of Salamanca